Resurrection is a 2001 Italian-French-German co-production directed by Paolo and Vittorio Taviani.

It won the Golden St. George award at the 24th Moscow International Film Festival.

Cast 
 Stefania Rocca : Katioucha Maslova
 Timothy Peach : Dimitri Nekhlioudov
 Marie Bäumer : Missy
 Cécile Bois : Mariette
 Eva Christian : Agrafena
 Marina Vlady: Zia Duchessa
 Giulio Scarpati: Simonson
 Antonella Ponziani: 	Vera

References

External links

2001 films
2001 television films
2001 drama films
Italian television films
Italian drama films
2000s Italian-language films
Films directed by Paolo and Vittorio Taviani
Films based on Resurrection
Films set in the 19th century
Films set in Russia
Films scored by Nicola Piovani
2000s Italian films